Brinker is a surname of Dutch and German origin. Notable people with the surname include:

Anja Brinker (born 1991), German artistic gymnast from Melle, Lower Saxony
Bill Brinker (1883–1965), Major League Baseball outfielder and third baseman
Bob Brinker, the host of the radio show Moneytalk
Chris Brinker (1970–2013), American film producer and director
Christine Brinker (born 1981), German skeet shooter
Howard Brinker (died 2004), NFL assistant coach
Maren Brinker (born 1986), female volleyball player from Germany
Nancy Brinker (born 1946), the founder and CEO of Susan G. Komen for the Cure
Norman E. Brinker (1931–2009), prominent restaurateur
Ruth Brinker (1922–2011), American AIDS activist and founder of the nonprofit Project Open Hand
Scott Brinker (born 1971), computer programmer and entrepreneur
Victory Brinker (born 2012), American child opera singer and actress

See also
Beebo Brinker (novel), lesbian pulp fiction novel written in 1962 by Ann Bannon
Brinker International (NYSE: EAT), the parent company of Chili's and Maggiano's Little Italy
Hans Brinker, or The Silver Skates, novel by American author Mary Mapes Dodge, first published in 1865
Komen Brinker Award for Scientific Distinction, for work in the fields of breast cancer research, screening or treatment
USS Henry Brinker (1861), small steamship acquired by the Union Navy during the American Civil War

Dutch-language surnames
German-language surnames
Low German surnames